Urmila Sathyanarayana is an Indian classical dancer of bharatanatyam.

Early life and background
Urmila Satyanarayna has been trained under the guidance of eminent gurus ‘Padmashri’ K.N. Dandayauthapani Pillai, Kalaimamani  K.J. Sarasa and Padmabhushan Kalanidhi Narayanan. She is primarily known for her Arramandi.

Career
Urmila has been a student of Bharatnatyam since the age of 5 and did her arrangetram at the age of 10. She has performed in venues at the national and international level, and has been the recipient of numerous awards including the Kalaimamani award of the state of Tamil Nadu.

Natya Sankalpa
Urmila started NATYA SANKALPA in the year 1996, at Kilpauk Gardens, Chennai. The institution emphasises on the knowledge of the theory of dance, carnatic music and yoga in the formation of a Bharatanatyam artist. Among the staff are talented artists such as Kalidasan Suresh, a renowned choreographer, and one of the few artists who can both wield the cymbals and provide vocal support simultaneously for a Bharatanatyam recital.

References

Bharatanatyam exponents
Living people
Performers of Indian classical dance
Artists from Chennai
Women artists from Tamil Nadu
1966 births